This list of museums in Vienna, Austria contains museums which are defined for this context as institutions (including nonprofit organizations, government entities, and private businesses) that collect and care for objects of cultural, artistic, scientific, or historical interest and make their collections or related exhibits available for public viewing. Also included are non-profit art galleries and university art galleries.

The list

Defunct museums
 Lipizzaner Museum

References 

 City of Vienna: Museums
 City of Vienna Tourism: Museums and Exhibitions

 
Vienna
Museums
Vienna